This is a list of people on the banknotes of different countries. The customary design of banknotes in most countries is a portrait of a notable citizen (living and/or deceased) on the front (or obverse) or on the back (or reverse) of the banknotes, unless the subject is featured on both sides.

Abkhazia
 Currency: Apsar (since 2008)

Albania
 Currency: Lek (pl. Lekë) (since 1926)Symbol: L

Angola
 Currency: Kwanza (since 1999)Symbol: Kz

Argentina

 Currency: Peso (since 1992)Symbol: $

Armenia
 Currency: Dram (since 1993)Symbol:

Artsakh
 Currency: Artsakh dram (since 2004)

Australia

 Currency: Dollar (since 1966)Symbol: A$

The Bahamas
 Currency: Dollar (since 1966)Symbol: B$

Bahrain
 Currency: Dinar (since 1965)
Symbol: BD

Bangladesh
 Currency: Taka (since 1972)Symbol: ৳

Barbados
 Currency: Dollar (since 1935)Symbol: $/Bds$

Bhutan
 Currency: Ngultrum (since 1974)Symbol: Nu

Bolivia
 Currency: Boliviano (since 1987)Symbol: Bs

Bosnia and Herzegovina
 Currency: Convertible mark (since 1998)Symbol: KM

Botswana
 Currency: Pula (since 1976)Symbol: P

Brunei
 Currency: Dollar (since 1967)Symbol: B$

Bulgaria
 Currency: Lev (pl. Leva) (since 1881)Symbol: лв

Burundi
 Currency: Franc (since 1916)Symbol: FBu

Cambodia
 Currency: Riel (since 1980)Symbol: ៛

Canada

 Currency: Dollar (since 1867)Symbol: $

Cape Verde
 Currency: Escudo (since 1914)Symbol:

Chile
 Currency: Peso (since 1975)Symbol: $

China

 Currency: Renminbi (since 1948)Symbol: ¥

Colombia
 Currency: Peso (since 1837)Symbol: $

Comoros
 Currency: Franc (since 1920)Symbol: CF

Congo, Democratic Republic (Congo-Kinshasa)
 Currency: Franc (since 1997)Symbol: FC

Costa Rica
 Currency: Colón (since 1896)Symbol: ₡

Croatia
 Currency: Kuna (since 1994)Symbol: kn

Cuba
 Currency: Cuban peso (since 1857)Symbol: $, $MN

Czech Republic

 Currency: Czech koruna (since 1993)Symbol: Kč

Denmark
 Currency: Krone (since 1873)Symbol: kr

Djibouti
 Currency: Franc (since 1948)Symbol:Fdj

Dominican Republic
 Currency: Peso (since 1844)Symbol: $/RD$

Eastern Caribbean States
Currency: Dollar (since 1965)Symbol: $

Egypt

 Currency: Pound (since 1836)Symbol: £E

Eswatini
 Currency: Lilangeni/Emalangeni (since 1974)Symbol: L or E (pl.)

Fiji
 Currency: Dollar (since 1969)Symbol: $

The Gambia
 Currency: Dalasi (since 1971)Symbol: D

Georgia
 Currency: Lari (1995– Present)Symbol: GEL/

Ghana
 Currency: Cedi (since 2007)Symbol: GH₵

Gibraltar
 Currency: Pound (since 1927)Symbol: £

Guatemala
 Currency: Quetzal (since 1925)Symbol: Q

Guernsey
 Currency: Pound (since 1921)Symbol: £

Haiti
 Currency: Gourde (since 1872)Symbol: G

Honduras
 Currency: Lempira (since 1931)Symbol: L

Hungary

 Currency: Forint (since 1946)Symbol: Ft

Iceland
 Currency: Króna (since 1874)Symbol: kr

India

 Currency: Rupee (since 1947)Symbol:₹

Indonesia

 Currency: Rupiah (since 1946)Symbol: Rp

Iran
 Currency: rial (since 1932)Symbol:

Iraq
 Currency: Dinar (since 1932)Symbol: ع.د

Israel

 Currency: New Sheqel/Shekel (since 1985)Symbol: ₪

Jamaica
 Currency: Dollar (since 1969)Symbol: J$

Japan

 Currency: Yen (since 1870)Symbol: ¥/円

Jersey
 Currency: Pound (since 1837)Symbol: £

Jordan
 Currency: Dinar (since 1950)Symbol: دينار

Kazakhstan
 Currency: Tenge (since 1993)Symbol:

Kenya
 Currency: Shilling (since 1966)Symbol: KSh

North Korea
 Currency: Won (since 1947)Symbol: ₩

South Korea

 Currency: Won (since 1962)Symbol: ₩

Kyrgyzstan
 Currency: Som (since 1993)Symbol: сом/

Laos
 Currency: Kip (since 1952)Symbol: ₭ or ₭N

Lesotho
 Currency: Loti/Maloti (since 1979)Symbol: L or M (pl.)

Liberia
 Currency: Dollar (since 1943)Symbol: L$

Libya
 Currency: Dinar (since 1971)Symbol: LD/ل.د

Malawi
 Currency: Kwacha (since 1971)Symbol: MK

Malaysia
 Currency: Malaysian ringgit (since 1967)Symbol: RM

Mauritius
 Currency: Rupee (since 1876)Symbol: ₨

Mexico
 Currency: Peso (since 1821)Symbol: $

Moldova
 Currency: Leu (pl. Lei) (since 1992)Symbol: L

Mongolia
 Currency: Tögrög/Tugrik (since 1925)Symbol: ₮

Morocco
 Currency: Dirham (since 1960)Symbol: د.م.

Mozambique
 Currency: Metical (since 1980)Symbol: MT

Namibia
 Currency: Dollar (since 1993)Symbol: N$

New Zealand

 Currency: Dollar (since 1967)Symbol: $

Nigeria
 Currency: Naira (since 1973)Symbol: ₦

Nicaragua
 Currency: Córdoba (since 1991)Symbol: C$

Norway

 Currency: Krone (since 1875)Symbol: kr

Oman
 Currency: Rial (since 1970)Symbol: ريال

Papua New Guinea
 Currency: Kina (since 1975)Symbol: K

Pakistan
 Currency: Rupee (since 1947)Symbol: Rs. (singular Re. 1)

Paraguay
 Currency: Guaraní (since 1943)Symbol:

Peru
 Currency: Nuevo sol/Sol (since 1991)Symbol: S/.

Philippines

 Currency: Peso (piso) (since 1903)Symbol: ₱

Poland

 Currency: Zloty (since 1924)Symbol: zł

Romania

 Currency: Leu (plural Lei) (since 1867)Symbol: L

Russia
 Currency: Ruble (since 1710)Symbol: руб/₽

Samoa
 Currency: Tālā (since 1967)Symbol: WS$

São Tomé and Príncipe
 Currency: Dobra (since 1977)Symbol: Db

Saudi Arabia
 Currency: Riyal (since 1953)Symbol: ر.س

South Africa
 Currency: Rand (since 1961)Symbol: R

South Sudan
 Currency: Pound (since 2011) and Piaster (since 2011)Symbol: £

Serbia
 Currency: Dinar (since 2003)Symbol: din.

Sierra Leone
 Currency: Leone (since 1964)Symbol: Le

Singapore

 Currency: Dollar (since 1967)Symbol: S$

Sri Lanka
 Currency: Rupee (since 1872)Symbol: (රු, Rs, ரூ)

Sweden
 Currency: Krona (since 1873)Symbol: kr

Switzerland

 Currency: Franc (since 1850)Symbol: Fr.

Syria
 Currency: Pound (£S; since 1919)

Taiwan (Republic of China)

 Currency: New Taiwan dollar (since 1949)Symbol: $

Tanzania
 Currency: Shilling (since 1966)Symbol: TSh

Tajikistan
 Currency: Somoni (since 1999)Symbol: cомонӣ

Thailand
 Currency: Baht (since 1925)Symbol: ฿

Tonga
 Currency: Paʻanga (since 1967)Symbol: T$

Transnistria
 Currency: Rubla (since 1994)Symbol:

Tunisia
 Currency: Dinar (since 1960)Symbol: DT

Turkey

 Currency: Lira (since 2009)Symbol: TL/

Turkmenistan
 Currency: New manat (since 2009)Symbol: T

Ukraine

 Currency: Hryvnia (pl. Hryvni and Hryven) (since 1996)Symbol: ₴

United Kingdom

 Currency: Pound sterling (England since 1158; Scotland since 1707)Symbol: £

While the Bank of England is the central bank for the whole of the United Kingdom, a total of eight commercial banks retain the right to issue their own pound sterling notes.

England and Wales

  In England and Wales the Bank of England is the only bank with the right to issue pound sterling banknotes

Scotland

 Three commercial banks in Scotland are authorised to issue their own sterling banknotes: Bank of Scotland, Royal Bank of Scotland and Clydesdale Bank.

Northern Ireland

 In Northern Ireland, four commercial banks are authorised to issue their own sterling banknotes: Ulster Bank, Danske Bank (formerly Northern Bank), First Trust Bank and Bank of Ireland. Of these, only banknotes issued by Danske Bank and Ulster Bank feature portraits of real people, with First Trust's notes depicting generic "Irish citizens" and Bank of Ireland notes showing buildings.

United States of America

 Currency: Dollar (since 1792)Symbol: $

Uruguay
 Currency: Peso Uruguayo (since 1993)Symbol: $U

Uzbekistan
 Currency: Soum (since 1993)

Venezuela
 Currency: Venezuelan bolívar soberano (sovereign bolívar) (since 2018)Symbol: Bs.S

Vietnam
 Currency: Dong (since 1978)Symbol: ₫

Zambia
 Currency: Kwacha (since 1968)Symbol: ZK

Notes

External links
IRANNOTES.com | High Quality IRANIAN Banknotes and Coins

 Ron's WPM Homepage
 Gallery of who/what is featured on 1200+ modern banknotes 
 Central Bank of Argentina
 Reserve Bank of Australia
 Bank of Canada
 Bank of the Republic (Colombia)
 Croatian National Bank
 Denmark National Bank
 Central Bank of Egypt
 Bank of England
 Bank of Estonia
 Hungarian Mint Ltd.
 Central Bank of Iceland
 Reserve Bank of India
 Bank of Japan
 States of Jersey Online
 Bank of Lithuania
 Bank of Mexico
 Central Bank of Russia
 Scottish banknotes (Committee of Scottish Clearing Bankers)
 SinoBanknote.com (People's Republic of China, Republic of China, Hong Kong, Macau)
 United States Bureau of Printing and Engraving

 
Numismatics
Banknotes